Circumstance or circumstances may refer to:

Law 
 Attendant circumstance, a legal concept which Black's Law Dictionary defines as the "facts surrounding an event"
 Aggravating circumstance, a circumstance attending the commission of a crime which increases its enormity or adds to its consequences
 Exigent circumstance, allowing law enforcement to enter a structure outside the bounds of a search warrant 
 Extenuating circumstances, information regarding a defendant or crime that might result in reduced charges or a lesser sentence

Arts and media

Films
 Circumstance (2011 film), a 2011 dramatic film written and directed by Maryam Keshavarz
 Circumstance (1922 film), a 1922 Australian silent film directed by Lawson Harris

Literature
 "Circumstance" (short story), an allegorical short story by Harriet Elizabeth Prescott Spofford
 Circumstance, a 1935 novel by William M. John

Music
 Pomp and Circumstance Marches, a series of marches for orchestra composed by Sir Edward Elgar
 "Circumstances" (song), a 1978 song by the Canadian band Rush

Other uses 
 Circumstances (rhetoric), questions whose answers are considered basic in information gathering or problem solving

See also
 Circumstantial (disambiguation)
 Community of circumstance, a group of people who share a position, circumstance, or life experiences